Rieppeleon brevicaudatus, commonly known as the bearded leaf chameleon or bearded pygmy chameleon, is a chameleon originating from the eastern Usambara and Uluguru Mountains in northeastern Tanzania and Kenya. It is easily distinguished from others in the Rieppeleon genus by the presence of a "beard" below the mouth, consisting of a few raised scales. At a full grown length of only 3 in (8 cm), it is marked by somewhat drab coloring in comparison to other chameleons, usually assuming a brown or tan coloring. It is quite capable of changing its coloration, though, often taking on a shade to blend into the background and becoming darker when under stress. It is also capable of compressing its body laterally and producing a stripe down its side, mimicking a dead leaf. It often assumes this form when sleeping in the open. It can adopt a variety of colors, including yellow, green, orange, black, and brown. A common misconception is that these chameleons use their color-changing abilities as camouflage, but they actually use their color-changing skin to court and show stress or emotion.  Males are distinguished by a longer tail, more prominent dorsal crest, slimmer body type, and persistent patterning. Like others in the family Chamaeleonidae, it is distinguished by independently rotating eye sockets and a tongue longer than its body.

References

Chameleon News brevicaudatus care guide

External links
The Pygmy Chameleon Community - Forums - Gallery - Care Sheets
Bearded Pygmy Chameleon Care Sheet

Rieppeleon
Reptiles described in 1892
Taxa named by Paul Matschie
Reptiles of Kenya
Reptiles of Tanzania